The  was established in Matsue, Shimane Prefecture, Japan in 1979. Designed by Kiyonori Kikutake and with a total floor area of 854 sqm, it houses a collection of tea ceremony implements and other treasures acquired by the local Tanabe clan.

See also
 Japanese tea ceremony
 Shimane Art Museum

References

External links
 Tanabe Art Museum - Homepage 

Chadō
Museums in Shimane Prefecture
Art museums and galleries in Japan
Art museums established in 1979
1979 establishments in Japan